Give the People What They Want is the fifth studio album by American soul and funk band Sharon Jones & the Dap-Kings, released January 14, 2014 on Daptone Records. The album was nominated for Best R&B Album at the 57th Annual Grammy Awards.

Critical reception

Give the People What They Want received positive reception from music critics. At the review aggregator website Metacritic, which assigns a weighted average score based on independent reviews, the album scored an 80/100 based on 31 selected ratings, indicating "generally favorable" reviews. At The A.V. Club, Annie Zaleski graded the album a B+, noting that the album is not a "rehash of the past—or a collection that panders." Will Hermes writing for Rolling Stone rated the album three-and-a-half stars, stating that the band is "extending and preserving tradition; it remains a national treasure and an instant soul party." At Spin, Anupa Mistry rated it a seven out of ten, affirming that "The point is that music from another time can still thrill us in this one because of its practically tyrannical insistence on bliss." Ben Cardow of NME rated it a seven out of ten, commenting that "Rarely has reliability been this funky". At Slant, Kyle Fowle rated it three-and-a-half stars, writing that the music here is "reveling in a variety of musical tones, from confident, strutting anthems of independence to slow-burning, intimate ballads, but also displays Jones at her most vocally ferocious, lending a self-assured voice to the down and out."

At Allmusic, Fred Thomas rated it four stars, noting how "These ten songs sound almost designed to be played on repeat, and keep with the always colorful and ecstatically fun sound audiences have come to expect from one of the best acts going in retrofitted classic soul." Elysa Gardner of USA Today rated it three-and-a-half out of four, commenting that "her mighty voice and spirit undiminished" on which is "matched by the Dap-Kings' old-school R&B dynamism, and by the gritty, groovy indomitability conveyed in their new songs." At The Independent, Andy Gill rated it four stars, affirming that this release is "as good an R&B album as any in recent years." Maddy Costa writing for The Guardian rated it four stars, alluding to how the release "breathes passionate new life into the past." However, PopMatters Zachary Houle rated it a six out of ten, cautioning that the album "is a quasi-holding pattern and is middling in its success".

Track listing

The CD package includes a code for a free MP3 download of the album, which adds a 58-minute Daptone Records sampler.

Personnel
Sharon Jones - vocals
Homer Steinweiss - drums
Binky Griptite - guitars
Joseph M. Crispiano - guitars
Bosco Mann - bass, guitars, orchestral chimes, organ, tambourine, vibraphone
Neal Sugarman - tenor saxophone, piano
Cochemea Gastelum - baritone saxophone
Dave Guy - trumpet, bass
Fernando "Boogaloo" Velez - tambourine, congas

Additional Musicians
Aaron Johnson - trombone (tracks 1, 2, 5, 9)
Victor Axelrod - Farfisa organ (tracks 1, 2), orchestral chimes (track 1), glockenspiel (track 1), Wurlitzer electric piano (track 3)
Jimi "Popcorn" Ashes - timpani (tracks 1, 5, 9)
Jordan McLean - trumpet (track 1)
The Dapettes - background vocals

Charts

Weekly charts

Year-end charts

References

2014 albums
Sharon Jones & The Dap-Kings albums
Daptone Records albums